The Northwestern Mari (self definition: йөтнӫмӓл-кӓсвел маре) are a subgroup of the Mari people and the indigenous people of the Kirov and Nizhny Novgorod Oblasts of Russia. As with other Mari subgroups they are Volga Finns. Their native language is Northwestern Mari, one of the four surviving members of the Mari branch of the Uralic language family.

History 
The origin of the Northwestern Maris belongs to the larger history of the Mari people. Most scientists, based on linguistic and archaeological data, associated them with being descendants of the north-western part of the Iron Age Gorodets culture. It was localized between the middle Volga's right tributaries Oka and Sura. In the 6th century AD Gorodets population moved to the north bank of Volga up to Vetluga and Bolshaya Kokshaga rivers. There they was greatly influenced by the Ananyino culture. The differences between Northwestern and other groups of Mari appeared in the 9th-10th centuries. In the 10th-13th centuries some related upper Volga Dyakovo tribes joined to Northwestern Maris and were assimilated by them. During the unification of Russian principalities around Moscow the part of Northwestern Mari became a part of Moscovian State.

References

External links 
 Mari in Tonshaevo? They will! Finno-Ugric cultural center of Russian Federation
 Japanese scientist explores the northwest dialect of the Mari language. Finno-Ugric cultural center of Russian Federation

Mari people
Ethnic groups in Russia
Indigenous peoples of Europe
Kirov Oblast
Nizhny Novgorod Oblast
Volga Finns
Indigenous peoples of the Subarctic